Cove Presbyterian Church, also known as Cove Meeting House and Rich Cove, is a historic Presbyterian church located at Covesville, Albemarle County, Virginia.  It was built in 1809 and is a one-story, rectangular one-room, brick building.  The building was rebuilt and renovated in 1880 after it was destroyed by a tornado on June 12, 1880. It features Gothic arched windows and a steeply pitched gable roof. It was built for a congregation established in 1747, and has remained in continuous use.

It was added to the National Register of Historic Places in 1989.

References

External links

Cove Presbyterian Church, U.S. Route 29, Covesville, Albemarle County, VA: 8 measured drawings and 8 data pages at Historic American Buildings Survey

Churches in Albemarle County, Virginia
Presbyterian churches in Virginia
19th-century Presbyterian church buildings in the United States
Churches completed in 1809
Churches completed in 1880
Churches on the National Register of Historic Places in Virginia
National Register of Historic Places in Albemarle County, Virginia
Historic American Buildings Survey in Virginia
Brick buildings and structures